Brett Roberts is a former Republican Member of the Michigan House of Representatives, elected in 2014 who represented the 65th District.

Early life
Roberts was raised in Eaton County, Michigan and graduated from Charlotte High School.

Professional career
Roberts is a sixth-generation farmer and owner of a Dairy Queen in Charlotte, Michigan.

Political career
Roberts was elected to represent Michigan's 65th District in the Michigan House of Representatives in 2014, defeating Bonnie J. Johnson and Ronald Muszynski, following the departure of Mike Shirkey who went to serve in the Michigan Senate.

Electoral history

References

External links
 Campaign website

Living people
Farmers from Michigan
People from Eaton County, Michigan
Republican Party members of the Michigan House of Representatives
21st-century American politicians
People from Charlotte, Michigan
Year of birth missing (living people)